Marlon Farias Castelo Branco (born 14 September 1985 in Belém), or simply Marlon, is a Brazilian footballer. He currently plays for Tuna Luso.

Honours

Remo
Campeonato Paraense: 2008, 2022
Copa Verde: 2021

Criciúma
Campeonato Catarinense: 2013

References

External links
 Marlon at playmakerstats.com (English version of ogol.com.br)
 

1985 births
Living people
Brazilian footballers
Tuna Luso Brasileira players
Clube do Remo players
Vila Nova Futebol Clube players
Esporte Clube Novo Hamburgo players
Criciúma Esporte Clube players
CR Vasco da Gama players
Paysandu Sport Club players
Esporte Clube Bahia players
Capivariano Futebol Clube players
Águia de Marabá Futebol Clube players
Grêmio Esportivo Brasil players
Mirassol Futebol Clube players
Esporte Clube Santo André players
Association football defenders